Anil Joshi is a Gujarati language poet and essayist from Gujarat, India. He won Sahitya Akademi Award for Gujarati in 1990 for his essay collection Statue (1988). His significant works include Kadach (1970; Collection of poems), Barafna Pankhi (1981; Collection of poems) and Pavan Ni Vyaspithe (1988; Collection of Essay).

Early life 

Joshi was born on 28 July 1940 in Gondal to Ramanath and Tarabahen. His father was a high level officer in education department. He completed his schooling in Gondal and Morbi. He completed his Bachelor of Arts in 1964 from U.N. Mehta Arts College, Morbi and H.K. Arts College, Ahmedabad with Gujarati and Sanskrit literature. He got his Master of Arts in 1966 from Arts and Commerce College, Modasa and School of Language located at Gujarat University, Ahmedabad.

Joshi married Bharatiben on 15 July 1975, and they have a son and daughter, Sanket and Rachna.

Career 

Initially he wanted to become a cricketer. He started his career as a teacher of Gujarati at My Own High School, Himatnagar in 1962. He served as a teacher at K.K. Parekh Vidyalay, Amreli from 1968 to 1969. From 1971 to 1976, he served as a personal assistant of Vadilal Dagli, an editor of Commerce. During 1976 to 1977, he worked as a co-editor at Parichay Trust. In 1977, he joined Language Development Project of Mumbai Municipal Corporation and served there till retirement as an Advisor of Gujarati language.

It was 1962, when his poem Parigho (Circumferences) came out for first time in Kumar, a Gujarati literary magazine. He was associated with Re Math, a modernist literary movement in Gujarati. When his father was transferred to Amreli, he met Ramesh Parekh. They became very close friends.

Works 
Kadach (may be), his first anthology of poems, was published in 1970, followed by Ame Barafna Pankhi (1981) and Paniman Ganth Padi Joi (2012). He has worked in different genres of poetry such as Geet, Free Verse and Ghazals. But, he is mainly noted in Gujarati literature for his contribution in Geet. Statue (1988) and Pavan Ni Vyaspithe (1988) are two of his collections of Essays.

Recognition 
He won Sahitya Akademi Award for Gujarati in 1990 for his Essay collection Statue (1988). He announced in October 2015 that he will return award over killing of rationalist M. M. Kalburgi and others.

See also
 List of Gujarati-language writers

References

External links
 

Modernist writers
1940 births
Living people
Indian male essayists
Gujarati-language writers
Gujarati-language poets
People from Junagadh district
Indian male poets
Recipients of the Sahitya Akademi Award in Gujarati
Poets from Gujarat
20th-century Indian poets
20th-century Indian essayists
20th-century Indian male writers